Chumphon is a town (thesaban mueang) in southern Thailand, capital of the Chumphon Province and Mueang Chumphon District. The city is about 463 kilometers (288 miles) from Bangkok. As of 2005 it had a population of 33,522. The town covers the commune (tambon) Tha Taphao completely and parts of tambons Bang Mak, Wang Phai, Na Thung, Tak Daet, and Khun Krathing. Its main economic activity is agriculture.

History
Chumphon volunteers fought invading Japanese during World War II. Chumphon became a rail hub for Imperial Japan. It was a station on the Southern Line and connected to the short-lived Kra Isthmus Railway.

Geography
Chumphon lies just inland from the west coast of the Gulf of Thailand. To the west are the northern hills of the Phuket Range, a subrange of the Tenasserim Hills. These hills reach  in the area near Chumphon.

Climate
Chumphon has a tropical monsoon climate (Köppen climate classification Am) just falling short of a tropical rainforest climate (Köppen Af). Temperatures are hot throughout the year. The period from December to April has relatively less rainfall than from May to November, when rainfall can be very heavy, particularly in October and November.

Transport

Bus: There is a small bus system within the city itself. Trains and buses run to and from Bangkok every day. 

Road: The main road through Chumphon is Thailand Highway 4, also known as Phetkasem Road, leading north to Bangkok, and south to Ranong, Phang Nga, Krabi, Trang, Phatthalung, and the border with Malaysia near Sadao.

Rail: The Chumphon railway station is on the Southern Line of the State Railway of Thailand. Trains also stop at Pathio railway station in Chumphon Province. 

Air: The city's airport, Chumphon Airport (IATA: CJM, ICAO: VTSE) is 30 km north in Pathio District. The airport has daily flights to Bangkok.

Nok Air and Thai AirAsia operate multiple daily flights between Bangkok (Don Mueang, DMK) and Chumphon Airport. The airport is a hub and regional gateway providing connecting services to Chumphon city and high speed ferry services to the islands of the Gulf of Thailand including Ko Tao and Ko Samui.

Popular culture
 In the science fiction novel, The Chronoliths, Chumphon is the landing site of the first .

References

External links

Populated places in Chumphon province
Cities and towns in Thailand